Kishertsky District is an administrative district (raion) of Perm Krai, Russia; one of the thirty-three in the krai. Municipally, it is incorporated as Kishertsky Municipal District. It is located in the southeast of the krai. Its administrative center is the rural locality (a selo) of Ust-Kishert. Population:  The population of Ust-Kishert accounts for 32.9% of the district's total population.

Geography and climate

History
The district was created on January 15, 1924 as Ust-Kishertsky District of Kungur Okrug of Ural Oblast. It was renamed Kishertsky District on September 30, 1925.

Demographics
The most numerous ethnic groups, according to the 2002 Census, include Russians at 94.7% and Tatars at 3%.

Economy
The economy of the district is based on agriculture, mining, forestry, and food industries.

References

Notes

Sources

Districts of Perm Krai
States and territories established in 1924